The Congress of the Communist Party of the Soviet Union was the supreme decision-making body of the Communist Party of the Soviet Union. Its meetings served as convention of all party delegates and their predecessors.

Between the congresses the party was ruled by the Central Committee. Over the course of the party's history, the name was changed in accordance with the current name of the party at the time. The frequency of party congresses varied with the meetings being annual events in the 1920s while no congress was held at all between 1939 and 1952.  After the death of Joseph Stalin, the congresses were held every five years.

Keys

Convocations

See also

 Organization of the Communist Party of the Soviet Union

References

General
Information on congresses, number of delegates, number of people elected to CCs, party membership, the individual who presented the Political Report and information on when the congress was convened can be found in these sources:

Bibliography
Articles and journals:

Specific

 
Soviet Union, Communist Party